Charles M. "Mitch" Mitchell III (born December 25, 1959) is an American guitarist, songwriter and producer, best known as the lead guitar in the early lineups of Dayton, Ohio, band Guided by Voices sporadically from 1983 to 1996. After leaving the band, Mitchell formed his own group, Mitch Mitchell's Terrifying Experience.

In late 2010, Guided by Voices embarked on a short reunion tour, resulting in a new "Classic Lineup" Guided By Voices album, Let's Go Eat The Factory. The reunion spanned four years and six albums before disbanding once more in September 2014.

References

External links

 The Guided by Voices Database

Living people
Musicians from Cleveland
Musicians from Dayton, Ohio
Arena Rock Recording Company artists
Guided by Voices members
American rock guitarists
American male guitarists
Guitarists from Ohio
1959 births